Events during the year 2020 in Bhutan.

Incumbents 

 Monarch: Jigme Khesar Namgyel Wangchuck
 Prime Minister: Lotay Tshering

Events 

 March 6 - The first confirmed COVID-19 case is reported, a 76-year-old US male who travelled to the country via India.
 March 22 - Jigme Khesar Namgyel Wangchuck announced in a national address that the country's land borders would be sealed off.

References 

2020 in Bhutan
Bhutan
Bhutan
2020s in Bhutan
Years of the 21st century in Bhutan